Joseph McCarthy is Alive and Living in Dade County is a 1977 musical revue with sketches, compositions, and lyrics by Ray Scantlin. It opened on August 8 1977 at the Caliboard Theater in Los Angeles. The show described itself as a "satirical" and "self-serving musical polemic on gay rights", which discusses "who has the right to judge, and in whose name they name their wars". The show was directed by John Allison.

In 2005 a cast album for the show was released.

Songs 

 People Need Someone To Hate
 Schtick Center
 Rat On A Fag!
 Poetry
 Role Model
 Beethoven
 Lola
 Hay Fever
 A Southern Barbecue
 Who Have You Loved Today?
 Sunday School
 George And Gracie
 The Children

References 

1977 musicals
American musicals
LGBT-related musicals
Original musicals
Revues